John Azor Kellogg (March 16, 1828February 10, 1883) was an American lawyer, politician, and Union Army officer from Wisconsin. He was one of the founders of the Republican Party.

Early life
Born in Bethany, Pennsylvania, Kellogg moved with his parents to Sauk County, Wisconsin, in 1840. At age 18, he studied law at the University of Wisconsin–Madison. In 1852, Kellogg married Adelaide Worthington of Prairie du Sac, Wisconsin, they would eventually have five children.

In 1857, he was admitted to the State Bar of Wisconsin and moved to Mauston, Wisconsin, in Juneau County. He was elected District Attorney for Juneau County in 1860, but resigned in April 1861 to enter service with the Union Army in the American Civil War.

Civil War
Kellogg helped raise Company K, 6th Wisconsin Volunteer Infantry Regiment, and was commissioned first lieutenant for that Company on May 3, 1861, under Captain Rufus Dawes. Upon their arrival in Washington, D.C., the regiment was organized into a brigade along with three other regiments from Wisconsin and Indiana. Their brigade would later become known as the Iron Brigade, and would be attached to the Army of the Potomac for most of the war.

Kellogg was promoted to captain of Company I in December 1861, and was made an adjutant for the brigade in 1863. He returned to his role with the regiment in 1864.

Kellogg was wounded on May 5, 1864, during the Battle of the Wilderness, and was believed dead.  He had actually been taken prisoner.  He was held in Virginia for a time, then transferred to Georgia. He escaped while en route to Charleston, South Carolina, but was pursued and recaptured.  On October 15, while being transferred from Charleston to Columbia, South Carolina, Kellogg escaped again.  This time he successfully reached Union forces near Calhoun, Georgia, having traveled 350 miles after his escape.

While a prisoner of war, Kellogg had been promoted to major and then lieutenant colonel. In December 1864 he was made colonel of the 6th Wisconsin Volunteer Regiment.  On February 28, 1865, Kellogg was placed in command of the Iron Brigade.  He commanded the brigade through the Appomattox Campaign at the close of the war and mustered out in August 1865.  He was subsequently given a brevet to brigadier general in recognition for his service.

Postbellum years
After the war, Kellogg moved to La Crosse, Wisconsin, and served as a U.S. Pension Agent for La Crosse from 1866 to 1875.  In 1875, Kellogg moved with his family to Wausau, Wisconsin, to return to his law practice.  Kellogg remained active with the Republican Party throughout his life, and, in 1878, was elected to the Wisconsin State Senate, defeating Democrat M. H. Wadleigh.

Published works
Kellogg published articles about his involvement in the Civil War. In 1908, the articles were collected and published by the Wisconsin Historical Commission as Capture and Escape: A Narrative of Army and Prison Life.

Electoral history

Citations

References

External links
 

1828 births
1883 deaths
People from Bethany, Pennsylvania
Politicians from La Crosse, Wisconsin
People from Sauk County, Wisconsin
Politicians from Wausau, Wisconsin
People of Wisconsin in the American Civil War
University of Wisconsin–Madison alumni
Union Army colonels
Wisconsin lawyers
Writers from La Crosse, Wisconsin
Writers from Pennsylvania
Wisconsin state senators
19th-century American politicians
19th-century American lawyers
Military personnel from Pennsylvania